Arctiocossus castaneus is a moth in the family Cossidae. It is found in South Africa.

References

Natural History Museum Lepidoptera generic names catalog

Endemic moths of South Africa
Cossinae
Moths described in 1929
Moths of Africa